Murya-myeon (Hangeul: 물야면, Hanja: 物野面) is a myeon or a township in Bonghwa county of North Gyeongsang province in South Korea. Murya-myeon is further divided into eight "ri", or small villages.

Administrative divisions
Orok-ri (오록리)
Gapyeong-ri (가평리)
Gaedan-ri (개단리)
Ojeon-ri (오전리)
Apdong-ri (압동리)
Dumun-ri (두문리)
Susik-ri (수식리)
Bukji-ri (북지리)

Schools
Murya Elementary School(물야초등학교) in Orok-ri with branch facilities in Gaedan-ri, Bukji-ri, and Susik-ri.
Murya Middle School (물야중학교) in Orok-ri.

Sources

External links
  Murya-myeon Office Homepage
 Tourist Map of Bonghwa county including Murya-myeon

Towns and townships in North Gyeongsang Province
Bonghwa County